U.S. Route 6 (US 6) is a major east–west road in the U.S. state of Rhode Island. Nationally, the route continues west to Bishop, California, and east to Provincetown, Massachusetts. In western Rhode Island, it forms part of one of several routes between Hartford, Connecticut, and Providence and was planned to be replaced by Interstate 84 (I-84). The part of I-84 that was built, from I-295 to Olneyville, is now part of US 6. At Olneyville, US 6 joins Route 10 and heads east toward Downtown, Providence, where it turns south on I-95 and east on I-195. US 6 splits from I-195 in East Providence, crossing into Massachusetts on Warren Avenue. The whole route of US 6 is a state highway maintained by the Rhode Island Department of Transportation (RIDOT).

Route description
US 6 crosses from Killingly, Connecticut, into Foster just east of the end of the Governor John Davis Lodge Turnpike, formerly known as the Connecticut Turnpike (State Road 695). That part of US 6 was once the Foster and Scituate Turnpike, now called the Danielson Pike. It crosses Route 94 in Foster before crossing into Scituate.

Soon after entering Scituate, US 6 splits into bypass and business alignments. The business alignment runs further south along the old turnpike and is mostly signed as US 6 without a banner. The bypass is signed mostly as US 6 Bypass (US 6 Byp.) on sign assemblies but as bannerless US 6 on green guide signs. Most maps and information takes US 6 along the bypass.

The business and bypass cross Route 102 soon after splitting. The western half of the bypass is a two-lane limited-access road, with one grade separation, under Gleaner Chapel Road, and one intersection, at Route 102. This newer section ends as it merges with Route 101, once the Rhode Island and Connecticut Turnpike, and now called Hartford Pike. The two parallel alignments cross the Scituate Reservoir and Route 116 before they merge near the east edge of Scituate. This merge was the east end of the Foster and Scituate Turnpike and was the east end of Route 101 until the early 2000s (when it was truncated to the merge with US 6 Byp.). (The Rhode Island and Connecticut Turnpike continued to the Olneyville section of Providence, where it is known as Hartford Avenue.)

Soon after the bypass and business routes merge, US 6 enters Johnston. Several miles later, it intersects with I-295. From I-295 to Olneyville, the old road—Hartford Avenue—is now US 6A, as US 6 uses the Dennis J. Roberts Expressway. To get there, it turns south on the I-295 collector–distributor roads to the west end of that freeway. The south interchange of US 6 and I-295 has numerous ramp stubs once intended for a western continuation of the Roberts Expressway as I-84.

The six-lane Roberts Expressway has interchanges with Route 5, US 6A, Route 128, and US 6A again on its way to Olneyville. It crosses from Johnston into Providence just west of the bridge over Route 128. At the second US 6A interchange, the older Olneyville Bypass begins, and the freeway reduces to four lanes. Heading around Olneyville to the south and east, US 6 has partial interchanges with Route 14, Route 10, and Broadway before merging with Route 10 toward Downtown, Providence, on the Route 6-10 Connector. Along the connector is an interchange with Dean Street before it (and Route 10) ends at I-95, with ramps to Memorial Boulevard for downtown access. US 6 turns south there with I-95. US 6 soon leaves I-95 for I-195, which takes it east across the south side of downtown. US 1A and US 44 join after it crosses the Providence River, and the four routes head east across the Washington Bridge over the Seekonk River.

Upon crossing the Washington Bridge, US 6 enters East Providence. US 44 leaves onto Taunton Avenue at the east end of the bridge, and Route 103—the old alignment of US 6—begins on Warren Avenue. (Some signs still mark Warren Avenue as US 6, but signs in both directions on US 6 keep it on I-195.) After interchanges with Broadway and Pawtucket Avenue—the latter carrying Route 114 in both directions and US 1A to the north—US 6 splits from I-195 at the interchange with Route 114 (East Shore Expressway). It takes the ramps toward Warren Avenue, which it uses most of the way to the state line before heading southeast on Highland Avenue to cross into Seekonk, Massachusetts.

History

In Rhode Island, US 6 was originally New England Route 3 (Route 3) of the New England road marking system, designated in 1922. The part of Route 3 in Rhode Island ran roughly how US 6 does now; the main differences were in Scituate (where it used US 6 Bus.) and from Johnston east through Providence and East Providence (where it used US 6A, Broadway, Washington Street, Waterman Street, the old Red Bridge and Waterman Avenue, and then turned south on Pawtucket Avenue and east along current Route 103 to reach Massachusetts).

By the time Route 3 became US 6 in late 1926, it had been moved to use Waterman Avenue through East Providence to Massachusetts. (In Massachusetts, US 6 turned south on present Route 114A to reach its current alignment.) Waterman Street in Providence had become one-way eastbound by 1930; westbound US 6 came off the Red Bridge and turned north on River Street, west on South Angell Street and Angell Street, and south on Benefit Street.

At some point, possibly by 1929, US 6 had moved from the Red Bridge to the Washington Bridge. In Downtown, Providence, it turned south on Main Street and east on Fox Point Boulevard (now I-195) to reach the bridge, taking Taunton Avenue (now US 44) into Massachusetts (where it turned south on present Route 114A).

US 6 was realigned to bypass downtown to the south via the Point Street Bridge by 1942. It came along Westminster Street from Olneyville, turning southeast on Winter Street (now Fricker Street) and Lockwood Street. A short one-way pair on Lockwood and Friendship streets (eastbound) and Pine and Summer streets (westbound) led to Point Street and over the bridge of the same name to the west end of Fox Point Boulevard. Upon coming off the Washington Bridge, instead of heading northeast on Taunton Avenue, it had been moved to the more direct Warren Avenue by 1942.

When the Olneyville Bypass opened in 1953, US 6 was rerouted to use it. Eastbound US 6 simply exited the bypass onto Westminster Street to rejoin its old route, but westbound US 6 used a totally different route. It turned northwest on Main Street instead of crossing the Point Street Bridge and turned west at Waterman Street to reach Promenade Street, then passing through the large rotary north of Union Station onto Kinsley Avenue. (Kinsley Avenue was later one-way eastbound in that area, so US 6 west continued on Promenade Street from the rotary, crossing to Kinsley Avenue somewhere to the west.

When the Broad Freeway—the section of I-195 south of downtown—opened in 1958, it replaced part of eastbound US 6. Instead of turning east on Point Street, US 6 instead continued northeast on Friendship Street to reach the freeway. In 1963 and 1964, I-95 was opened at the west end of I-195; the eastbound entrance from Friendship was slightly moved but otherwise remained the same. To the east of the Washington Bridge, the East Providence Expressway—another section of I-195—opened in 1959. Maps (and even some current signage) disagree about whether US 6 moved to the new bypass at that point or remained on Warren Avenue.

To the west of the Providence area, the three-lane bypass (one lane eastbound and two lanes westbound) of Scituate opened . This road is signed with US 6 Byp. signs, while the old route is still signed as US 6.

Dennis J. Roberts Expressway

The Dennis J. Roberts Expressway opened in 1971, providing a bypass of US 6 from I-295 in Johnston east to Olneyville. However, US 6 was not moved to it, as it was part of the planned I-84 (approved in 1968). It was assigned the temporary designation of Rhode Island Route 195 (Route 195), as the planned I-84 would continue east from Olneyville to the west end of I-195. The freeway was also signed as US 6 Byp. However, I-84 was never completed, and in 1991 US 6 was moved to the freeway, with the old route redesignated US 6A.

In Downtown, Providence, US 6 was moved in 1988 with the opening of the Route 6-10 Connector between Olneyville and downtown. US 6 was moved off the long one-way pair and onto the connector, turning south on I-95 and east on I-195. With the construction of the Iway, traffic was rerouted further south.

Future

RIDOT has started renumbering exits along I-195. Exits on I-95 will be renumbered in 2022. 

A plan has been proposed to close westbound exit 1D (Gano Street) and open a new exit, exit 1E (Waterfront Avenue), along I-195.

Major intersections
RIDOT is in the process of renumbering exits from sequential numbering to a mileage-based system to conform with federal highway standards. Exits on the US 6 segments concurrent with I-95, I-195, and I-295 were renumbered. The exit numbers were signed with the three Interstates.

Related routes
There are three special routes of US 6 in the state of Rhode Island: US 6 Bus. and US 6 Byp. in Scituate and US 6A in Johnston and Providence.

Danielson Pike

Danielson Pike, formerly known as the Foster and Scituate Turnpike, runs concurrent with US 6 and US 6 Bus. in Foster and Scituate.

Major intersections

References

External links

Route 6-10 Interchange Project

06
 Rhode Island
Transportation in Providence County, Rhode Island